The Federated Sabah People's Front or Barisan Rakyat Sabah Bersekutu (BERSEKUTU) was a political party based in Kota Kinabalu, Sabah, Malaysia. The party was formed in March 1998 by the former Chief Minister of Sabah, Harris Salleh who wanted to replicate the success of Sabah People's United Front (Berjaya) he once led.

1999 General Election
Harris decided that the party should field candidates in all 48 constituencies of the Sabah State Legislative Assembly, compared to the 40 contested by Sabah United Party (PBS). However, they fared poorly, losing deposits; Barisan Nasional won 31 seats and PBS the remaining 17.

Dissolution
The party's President, Berman Angkap announced its dissolution on 15 December 2010. He then formed a new party, the Sabah People's Front or Barisan Rakyat Sabah (SPF).

General election results

References

Defunct political parties in Sabah
Political parties established in 1998
Political parties disestablished in 2010
1998 establishments in Malaysia
2010 disestablishments in Malaysia